Tamás Kásás (born 20 July 1976) is a retired Hungarian water polo player.

Kásás is often described as the best defensive player of his era, if not the best overall. He is known for his ability to spring out of the water and block shots, as well as his strength in one-on-one situations. He is also noted for his highly accurate shots and passes.

He picked up the sport at the age of six, being taught by his father Zoltán, who is a coach in Hungary. Zoltán Kásás was also a gifted player who won an Olympic silver medal in 1972, a World Championship in 1973, and a European title in 1974.

He made his Olympic debut in 1996, where Hungary reached the semifinals before losing to the Manuel Estiarte-led Spanish squad. However, the Hungarian team bounced back to win European Championships in 1997 and 1999, as well as a Champions League cup in 1998, culminating with three Olympic gold medals at Sydney in 2000, Athens in 2004 and Beijing in 2008.

Kásás played in five consecutive Summer Olympics for his native country from 1996 to 2012. He is, jointly with Croat Igor Hinić and Greek Georgios Afroudakis, the tenth athlete to compete in water polo at five Olympics. He is also a leading goalscorer in Olympic water polo history, with 56 goals.

In 2007 Kásás won Euro League with Pro Recco. He was named Most Valuable Player at the 2002 FINA Men's Water Polo World Cup, where Hungary claimed the silver medal.

Honours

National
 Olympic Games:  Gold medal – 2000, 2004, 2008
 World Championships:  Gold medal – 2003;  Silver medal – 1998, 2005, 2007
 European Championship:  Gold medal – 1997, 1999;  Silver medal – 1995, 2006;  Bronze medal – 2001, 2003, 2008, 2012
 FINA World League:  Gold medal – 2003, 2004;  Bronze medal – 2002
 FINA World Cup:  Gold medal – 1995, 1999;  Silver medal – 2002, 2006;  Bronze medal – 1997
 Junior World Championships: (Gold medal – 1995)
 Junior European Championship: (Gold medal – 1994)

Club
European competitions: 
   Euroleague Winners (5): (1998 – with Posillipo; 2007, 2008, 2010, 2012 – with Pro Recco)
  LEN Cup Winners (2): (1997 – with UTE; 2005 – with Savona)
  LEN Super Cup Winners (4): (2007, 2008, 2010, 2012 – with Pro Recco)
 Adriatic League: 1x (2012 – with Pro Recco)
Domestic competitions: 
  Italian Championship (Serie A1): 9x (2000, 2001 – with Posillipo; 2005 – with Savona; 2007, 2008, 2009, 2010, 2011, 2012 – with Pro Recco)
  Italian Cup (Coppa Italia): 5x (2007, 2008, 2009, 2010, 2011 – with Pro Recco)

Awards
 Masterly youth athlete: 1996
 Member of the Hungarian team of year: 1997, 1999, 2000, 2003, 2004, 2008
 Hungarian Water Polo Player of the Year: 1999, 2006
 Member of  Hungarian national water polo team in the 20th century (2000)
World Cup MVP: 2002 Belgrade 
World Cup Top Scorer: 2002 Belgrade 
 Honorary Citizen of Budapest (2008)
 LEN Champions League Final Four MVP: 2011
 FINA Aquatics World Magazine – The Best water polo player of the Decade (2010)
 Ministerial Certificate of Merit (2012)
 Immortal member of the Hungarian Association of Athletes (2015)
 Príma díj (2015)
 Member of International Swimming Hall of Fame (2015)

Orders
   Officer's Cross of the Order of Merit of the Republic of Hungary (2000)
   Commander's Cross of the Order of Merit of the Republic of Hungary (2004)
   Commander's Cross of the Order of Merit of the Republic of Hungary with the Star (2008)

See also
 Hungary men's Olympic water polo team records and statistics
 List of athletes with the most appearances at Olympic Games
 List of players who have appeared in multiple men's Olympic water polo tournaments
 List of multiple Olympic gold medalists in one event
 List of Olympic champions in men's water polo
 List of Olympic medalists in water polo (men)
 List of men's Olympic water polo tournament top goalscorers
 List of world champions in men's water polo
 List of World Aquatics Championships medalists in water polo
 List of members of the International Swimming Hall of Fame

References

External links
 
 Tamás Kásás at Pro Recco (archived)

1976 births
Living people
Water polo players from Budapest
Hungarian male water polo players
Water polo drivers
Water polo players at the 1996 Summer Olympics
Water polo players at the 2000 Summer Olympics
Water polo players at the 2004 Summer Olympics
Water polo players at the 2008 Summer Olympics
Water polo players at the 2012 Summer Olympics
Medalists at the 2000 Summer Olympics
Medalists at the 2004 Summer Olympics
Medalists at the 2008 Summer Olympics
Olympic gold medalists for Hungary in water polo
World Aquatics Championships medalists in water polo
20th-century Hungarian people
21st-century Hungarian people